Koshkuh (also Romanized as Koshkūh) is a village in Sahray-ye Bagh Rural District, Sahray-ye Bagh District, Larestan County, Fars Province, Iran. At the 2006 census, its population was 124, in 28 families.

References 

Populated places in Larestan County